MacMillan, Macmillan, McMillan, and M'Millan are variants of a Scottish surname; see also the similar surname McMillen. The origin of the name derives from the origin of the Scottish Clan MacMillan. The progenitor of the clan was said to be Airbertach, Hebridean prince of the old royal house of Moray. Airbertach had a son named Cormac, who was a bishop, and Cormac's own son Gilchrist, or in Gaelic, Gille Chriosd, the progenitor of the Clann an Mhaoil, was a religious man like his father. Because of this, Gille Chriosd wore the tonsure, which gave him the nickname Maolan or Gillemaol. As a Columban priest, his head would have been shaved over the front of his head in the style of Saint John the Evangelist, rather than at the vertex of his head (the dominant style in The Church of Rome). This distinctive tonsure is described in Gaelic as 'Mhaoillan'. The name MacMillan thus literally means, "son of the tonsure".

People having this name include:

People 
 Robbie Coltrane (real name Anthony McMillan, (1950 - 2022), British actor
 Alexander Macmillan (disambiguation), several persons
 Angus McMillan (1810–1865), Australian explorer
 Archie McMillan (1894–1917), Scottish footballer
Ben McMillan (1961-2008), American musician; lead singer of Skin Yard and lead singer/rhythm guitarist of Gruntruck.
 Bertie McMillan, Scottish footballer
 Brian McMillan (born 1963), South African cricketer
 Brockway McMillan (1915–2016), American scientist, former undersecretary of the Air Force and the second director of the National Reconnaissance Office
 Bruce McMillan (disambiguation), several persons
 Colin R. McMillan (1935–2003), assistant United States secretary of defense
 Craig McMillan (born 1976), New Zealand cricketer
 Daniel Hunter McMillan (1846–1933), Manitoba politician
 Daniel MacMillan (1813–1857), British publisher, brother of Alexander Macmillan (publisher)
 Dave MacMillan (1886–1963), American basketball coach
 Dave McMillan (racing driver) (born 1944), New Zealand former racing driver
 David MacMillan, a Scottish born professor of organic chemistry
 David McMillan (footballer) (born 1988), Irish footballer
 Donald Baxter MacMillan  (1874–1970), American explorer
 Duncan MacMillan (disambiguation), several persons
 Edwin McMillan (1907–1991), American chemist and Nobel Prize winner
 Ernest MacMillan (1893–1973), Canadian musician
 Ethel McMillan (1904–1987), New Zealand politician
 Evan McMillan (born 1988), Irish footballer
 Francis MacMillen (1885–1973), American violinist
 Frank McMillan (1899–1966), Australian rugby league footballer
 Frew McMillan (born 1942), South African tennis player
 Gervan McMillan (1904–1951), New Zealand politician
 Gloria McMillan (1933-2022), American actress
 Gordon McMillan (born c. 1927), American ice hockey player
 Gordon McMillan (born c. 1953), South African cricket and badminton player 
 Gordon MacMillan (1897–1986), British World  general and hereditary chief of the Clan MacMillan
 Graham McMillan (born 1936), soccer player
 Hammy McMillan (born 1963), Scottish world champion curler
 Harold Macmillan (1894–1986), British prime minister
 Harry MacMillan, Scottish footballer
 Helen E. McMillan (1909–1984), American politician
 Herbert H. McMillan (born 1958), American politician
 H. R. MacMillan (1885–1976), Canadian forester
 Ian McMillan (born 1956), British poet
 J. Douglas MacMillan (1933–1991), Scottish pastor
 James McMillan (disambiguation), several persons
 John McMillan (disambiguation), several persons
 Judith McMillan (born 1945), American artist
 Keith B. McMullin (born 1941), LDS (Mormon) general authority emeritus and CEO, DMC
 Kenneth G. McMillan (born 1942), American politician
 Sir Kenneth MacMillan (1929–1992), Scottish-born choreographer
 Kirkpatrick Macmillan (1812–1878), Scottish blacksmith who invented the rear-wheel-driven bicycle
 Lachie McMillan (1900–1983), Scottish footballer
 Marcia MacMillan (born 1970), Canadian news anchor
 Margaret MacMillan (born 1943), Canadian historian
 Margaret McMillan (1860–1931), nursery education pioneer
 Michael McMillan (born 1962), British playwright, artist/curator and educator
 Nate McMillan (born 1964), former NBA player and coach of the Indiana Pacers
 Norman MacMillan (disambiguation), several persons
 Nolan MacMillan, (born 1990), current CFL player
 Paul F. McMillan, (born 1956), chemist and high pressure scientist
 Priscilla Johnson McMillan (1928–2021), American writer and journalist
 Quintin McMillan (1904–1948), South African cricketer
 Raekwon McMillan (born 1995), American football player
 Robert McMillan (disambiguation), several person 
 Stephen McMillan (born 1976), Scottish former footballer
 Thomas S. McMillan (1888–1939), American lawyer, politician, and college baseball coach
 William MacMillan (disambiguation), several persons
 Whitney MacMillan (born 1929), American businessman

Fictional characters 
 Trillian (character), or Tricia McMillan, character in The Hitchhiker's Guide to the Galaxy
 Ernie Macmillan, character in the Harry Potter book series
 Captain MacMillan, SAS sniper in the 2007 video game Call of Duty 4: Modern Warfare
 Stewart and Sally McMillan, title roles in the television series McMillan & Wife
 Joe MacMillan, character in the AMC TV series Halt and Catch Fire 
 Carl McMillan, partner of Mike Biggs, TV sitcom Mike & Molly

English-language surnames
Anglicised Scottish Gaelic-language surnames
Patronymic surnames